A portacaval shunt, portocaval shunt, or portal-caval shunt is a treatment for portal hypertension. A connection (a shunt) is made between the portal vein, which supplies 75% of the liver's blood, and the inferior vena cava, the vein that drains blood from the lower two-thirds of the body. The most common causes of liver disease resulting in portal hypertension are Budd–Chiari syndrome or cirrhosis. Budd–Chiari syndrome should not be mistaken for cirrhosis. 

Less common causes include diseases such as hemochromatosis, primary biliary cirrhosis (PBC), and portal vein thrombosis.

Cirrhotic patients often develop hepatic encephalopathy (HE) following the procedure, sometimes resulting in coma. The high risk of developing HE may be a consequence of increased intestinal absorption of encephalopathogenic substances in combination with the reduced hepatic blood flow.

A portacaval anastomosis is analogous in that it diverts circulation; as with shunts and anastomoses generally, the terms are often used to refer to either the naturally occurring forms or the surgically created forms.

References

External links
 

Vascular surgery
Implants (medicine)